Ronald Lawrence George (born March 20, 1970) is a former American football linebacker who played in the National Football League (NFL) from 1993 through 2000. He played college football at Stanford University and the United States Air Force Academy. He was an All-American in 1992 as a senior at Stanford.

External links
NFL.com bio

1970 births
Living people
American football linebackers
Stanford Cardinal football players
Air Force Falcons football players
Atlanta Falcons players
Minnesota Vikings players
Kansas City Chiefs players